James Edward McConnon (21 June 1922 – 26 January 2003) was an English cricketer, who played in two Tests in 1954 as an off-spin bowler. He played for Glamorgan from 1950 to 1961, albeit missing the 1956 season when he decided to play for Burnley in the Lancashire League. His 819 first-class wickets cost less than 20 runs  each.

Life and career
Jim McConnon was born in Burnopfield, County Durham. His was a late conversion to cricket, having played football for Aston Villa and Newport County. A knee injury resulted in McConnon switching sports and, for a short time, his lovely bowling action utilising long spinner's fingers threatened Jim Laker's role in the England team.

He made his first-class debut for Glamorgan against Surrey at the start of the 1950 season, in the same match as Don Shepherd. He claimed 100 wickets in a season three times, with 136 at 16.07 in 1951 being his best. Against the South African tourists in that year he took 6 for 27 including a hat-trick, helping Glamorgan to an unlikely victory.

McConnon's selection for the Ashes tour of 1954-55 was controversial in that it meant that Laker was not taken. As it was McConnon broke a finger during the tour, and he returned home early.

His season as a professional in the Lancashire League was successful: he topped the League bowling averages with 52 wickets at 6.8, and Burnley won the championship. After he left first-class cricket he played a few seasons of Minor Counties cricket for Cheshire.

McConnon and his wife Pauline had three children, Michael, Catherine and Christopher.

McConnon died in Altrincham, Greater Manchester, at the age of 80.

References

External links

1922 births
2003 deaths
England Test cricketers
English cricketers
Glamorgan cricketers
Commonwealth XI cricketers
Marylebone Cricket Club cricketers
Cheshire cricketers
People from Burnopfield
Cricketers from County Durham